

Squad
Updated 2 May 2010

Transfers

In

Out

Statistics

Appearances and goals
Last updated on 18 May 2010.

|}
Note

 * = Players who left the club mid-season

Top scorers
Includes all competitive matches

Note

 * = Players who left the club mid-season

Disciplinary record

Note

 * = Players who left the club mid-season

Captains

Penalties Awarded

International players
The following is a list of all squad members who have played for their national sides during the 2009–10 season. Players in bold were in the starting XI for their national side.

26 September 2009

29 January 2009

2 October 2009

7 October 2009

15 November 2009

18 November 2009

Starting 11

Overall
{|class="wikitable"
|-
|Games played || 41 (33 Primera División Uruguaya, 8 Copa Libertadores)
|-
|Games won || 25 (22 Primera División Uruguaya, 3 Copa Libertadores)
|-
|Games drawn || 7 (4 Primera División Uruguaya, 3 Copa Libertadores)
|-
|Games lost || 9 (7 Primera División Uruguaya, 2 Copa Libertadores)
|-
|Goals scored || 76
|-
|Goals conceded || 38
|-
|Goal difference || +38
|-
|Yellow cards || 130
|-
|Red cards || 13
|-
|Worst discipline ||  Mario Regueiro (12 , 2 )
|-
|Best result ||  6-0 (A) v Atenas – Primera División Uruguaya 2010.03.13
|-
|Worst result || 0-4 (A) v Montevideo Wanderers – Primera División Uruguaya 2009.10.17
|-
|Most appearances ||  Rodrigo Muñoz (38 appearances)
|-
|Top scorer ||  Sergio Blanco (13 goals)
|-

Club

Coaching staff

Friendlies

Copa Amistad

Copa Bimbo

Semi-finals

Final

Primera División Uruguaya

Apertura's table

The apertura's winner qualifies for the semifinal of the Primera División.

Matches

Clausura's table

The Clausura winner qualifies for the semifinal of the Primera División.

Matches

Aggregate table

 The Aggregate winner qualify for the final of Primera División and 2011 Copa Libertadores group stage.
 The Aggregate runners-up (if not qualified for the final) qualify for the 2011 Copa Libertadores first stage.
 The Aggregate third place (if not qualified for the final) qualify for the 2010 Copa Sudamericana first stage.
 The Aggregate fourth place (if not qualified for the final) qualify for the 2010 Copa Sudamericana first stage.

Results by round

Relegation

The three clubs with lowest points are relegated.

Semi-final

Final

First leg

Second leg

Peñarol won 2–1 on aggregate

Copa Libertadores

Group stage

Round of 16

First leg

Second leg

Cruzeiro won 6–1 on aggregate.

Records

Doubles achieved

Comeback
Nacional have conceded the first goal in a match 10 times this season in the Primera División and the Copa Libertadores, recorded 5 wins, 1 draw and 5 loss.
{| class="wikitable"
|-
!Opponent
!H/A
!Result
!Scoreline
|-
|Liverpool
|align=center|H
|align=center|2–1
|Alfaro 66,  Matías Rodríguez 73',  Lembo 86'
|-
|Racing
|align=center|H
|align=center|3–2
|Cauteruccio 8',  Quiñones 14''',  Balsas 45+3' (pen.),  49,  Ferro 79'
|-
|Central Español
|align=center|H
|align=center|5–1
|Espiga 49,  Aranda 56',  García 66' (pen.),  Lodeiro 71',  Blanco 72',  Varela 82'
|-
|Cerrito
|align=center|A
|align=center|5–2
|Franco 4',  90,  A. Morales 5',  Lodeiro 12',  32' (pen.),  Varela 54',  Blanco 83'
|-
|Deportivo Cuenca
|align=center|H
|align=center|3–2
|Granda 24',  Regueiro 46',  64',  Escalada 67',  A. Morales 82' (pen.)
|}

Biggest winning margin

Team statistics

Goal minutes
Updated to games played on 18 May 2010.

Honours

TeamPrimera División Uruguaya Fair Play Award Winners: 2008–09Copa Amistad
 Winners: 2009
Torneo Apertura
 Winners: 2009
Primera División Uruguaya Best team of the year
 Winners: 2009
Copa Bimbo
 Winners: 2010
Historical Table of the Copa Libertadores
 Winners: 2010

Individuals

See also
 Club Nacional de Football

References

External links
 Club Nacional de Football official web site

Club Nacional de Football seasons